The women's C-1 200 metres sprint canoeing event at the 2020 Summer Olympics took place on 4 and 5 August 2021 at the Sea Forest Waterway. At least 12 canoeists from at least 12 nations competed.

Background
This was the debut appearance of the event, replacing the men's C-1 200 metres as the Olympics moved towards gender equality. The women's C-1 200 metres has been an event at the ICF Canoe Sprint World Championships in 2010.

2019 World Champion teenager Nevin Harrison of the United States qualified for the event.

Qualification

A National Olympic Committee (NOC) could only qualify one boat (and thus earn one women's canoe quota place) in the event; however, NOCs could enter up to 2 boats in the event if they had enough women's canoe quota places from other events (that is, the C-2). A total of 12 qualification places were available, initially allocated as follows:

 1 place for the host nation, Japan, if it did not qualify any women's canoe quota places
 5 places awarded through the 2019 ICF Canoe Sprint World Championships
 5 places awarded through continental tournaments, 1 per continent
 1 place awarded through the 2021 Canoe Sprint World Cup Stage 2.

Qualifying places were awarded to the NOC, not to the individual canoeist who earned the place.

The Oceania spot was re-allocated to the World Championships, going to China. As the Americas continental tournament was cancelled, that place was also allocated through the World Championships, but the place ultimately went to Bulgaria because insufficient athletes had entered from the Americas. 

As Japan qualified a boat in the women's C-2 event,  its host nation place was also reallocated through the World Championships. This made a total of eight World Championship places that were awarded as follows:

Asia's continental place was earned by Thailand, Europe's by Spain, and Africa's by Nigeria. Croatia earned the final spot at the World Cup.:

Nations that could enter (additional) boats due to qualifying in the C-2:

Competition format
Sprint canoeing uses a four-round format for events with at least 11 boats, with heats, quarterfinals, semifinals, and finals. The details for each round depend on how many boats ultimately enter.

The course is a flatwater course 9 metres wide. The name of the event describes the particular format within sprint canoeing. The "C" format means a canoe, with the canoeist kneeling and using a single-bladed paddle to paddle and steer (as opposed to a kayak, with a seated canoeist, double-bladed paddle, and foot-operated rudder). The "1" is the number of canoeists in each boat. The "200 metres" is the distance of each race.

Schedule
The event was held over two consecutive days, with two rounds per day. All sessions started at 9:30 a.m. local time, though there are multiple events with races in each session.

Results

Heats
Progression System: 1st-2nd to SF, rest to QF

Heat 1

Heat 2

Heat 3

Heat 4

Heat 5

Quarterfinals
Progression System: 1st-2nd to SF, rest out.

Quarterfinal 1

Quarterfinal 2

Quarterfinal 3

Semifinals
Progression System: 1st-4th to Final A, rest to Final B.

Semifinal 1

Semifinal 2

Finals

Final A

Final B

References

Women's C-1 200 metres
Women's events at the 2020 Summer Olympics